The Daily Advertiser is a Gannett daily newspaper based in Lafayette, Louisiana. The Daily Advertiser covers international, national, state, and local news in the six parishes of Lafayette, Acadia, Iberia, St. Landry, St. Martin, and Vermilion. The publication circulates 28,400 copies on weekdays. Its ranks 234 out of 1,410 newspapers in the United States.

The Daily Advertiser was co-founded as the Weekly Advertiser in 1865 by a Confederate States Army veteran, William B. Bailey, who subsequently served from 1884 to 1892 as mayor of his native Lafayette.

Louisiana journalist Robert Angers (1919–1988) worked at times for The Daily Advertiser, including his ultimate position as business editor from 1985 until his death.

In 1998, The Daily Advertiser bought the local alternative weekly, the Times of Acadiana.

The circulation area is approximately 27 percent nonwhite; the nonwhite employees of the newspaper totaled approximately 17 percent in 2005.

Controversies 
The Advertiser has been accused of protecting the Catholic Church during molestation charges brought against priests in the mid-1980s. Later, in 2014, it gave a prominent op-ed to William Donahue of the Catholic League defending the protection of accused priests by the Church, a piece that has been criticized as containing substantial inaccuracies, by one of the lawyers who had defended the Church in the 1980s.

References

External links

Mass media in Lafayette, Louisiana
Newspapers published in Louisiana
Gannett publications